Skjold Neckelmann (born November 24, 1854 - May 13, 1903)  was a Danish-German architect, best known for designing four Strasbourg buildings that are landmarks of the Neustadt district - the National and University Library, the National Theatre, the Palais de Justice and  Saint-Pierre-le-Jeune Catholic Church.

Biography
Neckelmann was born in Hamburg, Germany.
He studied from 1874 in Vienna with Theophil  Hansen.

During his most productive years, Neckelmann worked as an associate with the German architect August Hartel. 

Neckelmann and Hartel designed many buildings together in Strasbourg including:

 1888–1892: National Theatre (built to house the legislative assembly of the German Imperial territory of Alsace-Lorraine, of which Strasbourg was the capital from 1871 to 1918)
 1889–1893: Church of Saint Pierre-le-Jeune catholique
 1889–1895: National and University Library

When Hartel died in Strasbourg in 1890, Neckelmann was obliged to see through alone all the projects which they had conceived together. He went on to design the Strasbourg Palais de Justice (1894 - 1898) alone, but it was his last major project. In 1901 he ceased all professional activity for health reasons. He died during 1903 in Neckargemünd.

Neckelmann had spent many years in Stuttgart. For many years he ran an architect's cabinet in Stuttgart, where the architect  (1871-1957) once worked. He also taught architecture in Stuttgart.

He was the author of a number of books, mostly on architecture, but also a book on Danish philosophers of the Renaissance (Denkmäler der Renaissance in Dänemark).

References

External links
 223 Projects by Neckelmann

1854 births
1903 deaths
Architects from Hamburg
19th-century Danish architects
19th-century German architects